John Davies (22 August 1943 – 23 December 1986) was an  Australian rules footballer who played with Geelong in the Victorian Football League (VFL).

References

External links 

1943 births
1986 deaths
Australian rules footballers from Victoria (Australia)
Geelong Football Club players
People educated at Geelong College